Aroldo Tieri (28 August 1917 – 28 December 2006) was an Italian actor. He appeared in more than 100 films between 1939 and 1969.

Life and career
Born in Corigliano Calabro, son of the journalist and playwright Vincenzo Tieri, Aroldo Tieri moved in Rome at 18 to study law at university, and in the meanwhile approached acting and enrolled the Accademia Nazionale di Arte Drammatica Silvio D'Amico.  Graduated in 1938, he almost immediately made his debut in theater and in film. Soon Tieri became one of the most popular and appreciated young actors, with a predisposition to the comic genre. In cinema Tieri specialized in roles on jealous, irascible, nervous boyfriends, and this characterization limited his career and caused his retirement from films in the late 1960s. His versatility was revealed especially on stage and on television, that at the end of the 1950s gave him notoriety with a successful adaptation of the Dickens' novel Nicholas Nickleby and then as host of Canzonissima in 1960.  Companion for many years on the scene of the actress Giuliana Lojodice, later his wife, Tieri formed a stage company with her in 1965 and the couple was very active in multiple projects at theater, radio and TV.

Selected filmography

 Mad Animals (1939)
 The Hussar Captain (1940)
 C'è sempre un ma! (1942)
 Disturbance (1942)
 Document Z-3 (1942)
 Music on the Run (1943)
 Redemption (1943)
 Come Back to Sorrento (1945)
 What a Distinguished Family (1945)
 Last Love (1947)
 Mad About Opera (1948)
 Crossroads of Passion (1948)
 Little Lady (1949)
 Sicilian Uprising (1949)
 Toto Looks for a House (1949) 
 The Elusive Twelve (1950)
 The Transporter (1950)
 Night Taxi (1950)
 Toto the Sheik (1950)
 Toto Looks for a Wife (1950)
 Beauties on Bicycles (1951)
 Song of Spring (1951)
 The Reluctant Magician (1951)
 Accidents to the Taxes!! (1951)
 Toto and the King of Rome (1951)
 It's Love That's Ruining Me (1951)
 Beauties in Capri (1952)
 Matrimonial Agency (1953)
 Cavalcade of Song  (1953)
 Noi siamo le colonne (1956)
 Tuppe tuppe, Marescià! (1958)
 The Adventures of Nicholas Nickleby (1958, TV series)
 Il raccomandato di ferro (1959)
 Ciao, ciao bambina! (1959)
 Non perdiamo la testa (1959)
 Who Hesitates is Lost (1960)
 Dreams Die at Dawn (1961)
 The Joy of Living (1961)
I due mafiosi (1964)
 Two Mafiamen in the Far West (1964)
 Soldati e capelloni (1967)

References

Further reading

External links

1917 births
2006 deaths
People from Corigliano Calabro
Italian male film actors
Accademia Nazionale di Arte Drammatica Silvio D'Amico alumni
20th-century Italian male actors
Italian male stage actors